Jamilya is a 1968 Soviet drama film directed by Sergei Yutkevich and Irina Poplavskaya.

The film is based on the 1958 novel Jamila by Chingiz Aitmatov.

Plot 
The film is told from the point of view of the narrator, an artist, who paints scenes of rural Kyrgyz life. These scenes are based on his childhood, which he reflects back upon for the bulk of the movie. The main part of the film takes place during the Great Patriotic War in what is now  Kyrgyzstan. Jamilya, a young woman, follows her parents orders by marrying Sadik, a man who she does not love. After marrying Jamilya, Sadik lives with her for only four months, then he is taken to the front, to fight in World War II. During this period,  women, old people and children went to the fields and sent wheat to the front lines where the men were fighting. Jamilya misses her husband.  However, Jamilya falls in love with the front-line soldier Daniyar, who has already returned from the war. After Sadik is wounded, he writes in a letter that he is returning home in two months, which makes everyone happy, except for Jamilya and Daniyar who are forced to confront the reality of their relationship.

Cast 
 Natalya Arinbasarova as Jaamilya
 Suymenkul Chokmorov as Daniyar
 Nasreddin Dubashev
 Aliman Zhankorozova as Dzhanyl
 Altynbek Kenzhekov as Sadyk 
 Mukhtar Bakhtygereyev as Osmon
 Bolot Beyshenaliev as Khudozhnik 
 Chingiz Aitmatov as Narrator (voice)
 Nasyr Kitayev as Orosmat

References

External links 
 

1968 films
1960s Russian-language films
Soviet drama films
Films based on novels
1968 drama films